Dan Laing (born in San Diego, California) raised in Chambersburg, Pennsylvania. Known as "The Dean" for formally being the dean of broadcasters in the Carolina League, former play-by-play voice of the Potomac Nationals is an update anchor on XM Sports Nation, XM 144. Laing can also be heard locally in the Washington, DC market on WTOP and as the radio play-by-play announcer for American University men's basketball. In addition to his current work, Laing called the action for 1999 and 2001 NCAA College World Series Champion Miami Hurricanes. Laing's updates on XM Radio can often be heard every 20 minutes.

References 

Year of birth missing (living people)
Living people
American radio personalities
People from Chambersburg, Pennsylvania